Henry George Burr (21 March 1872 – 20 December 1946) was a British sport shooter who competed in the 1912 Summer Olympics. In 1912 he won the silver medal with the British team in the team military rifle competition. In the 600 metre free rifle event he finished tenth.

References

External links
Henry Burr's profile at databaseOlympics

1872 births
1946 deaths
British male sport shooters
ISSF rifle shooters
Olympic shooters of Great Britain
Shooters at the 1912 Summer Olympics
Olympic silver medallists for Great Britain
Olympic medalists in shooting
Medalists at the 1912 Summer Olympics
20th-century British people